Frank Cyril Leonard Matthews (15 August 1892 – 11 January 1961) was an English first-class cricketer active 1920–27 who played for Nottinghamshire. He was born in Willoughby-on-the-Wolds; died in Nottingham.

References

1892 births
1961 deaths
English cricketers
Nottinghamshire cricketers